The term Captain Lieutenant may refer to:

Captain Lieutenant (Russian Navy), a rank in the Russian Navy, Red Fleet/Soviet Navy and previously Imperial Russian Navy
Captain-lieutenant, a former rank in the British army
Kapitänleutnant, a rank in the German Navy